Functional Design is a paradigm used to simplify the design of hardware and software devices such as computer software and, increasingly, 3D models. A functional design assures that each modular part of a device has only one responsibility and performs that responsibility with the minimum of side effects on other parts. Functionally designed modules tend to have low coupling.

Advantages
The advantage for implementation is that if a software module has a single purpose, it will be simpler, and therefore easier and less expensive, to design and implement.

Systems with functionally designed parts are easier to modify because each part does only what it claims to do.

Since maintenance is more than 3/4 of a successful system's life, this feature is a crucial advantage. It also makes the system easier to understand and document, which simplifies training. The result is that the practical lifetime of a functional system is longer.

In a system of programs, a functional module will be easier to reuse because it is less likely to have side effects that appear in other parts of the system.

Technique

The standard way to assure functional design is to review the description of a module.  If the description includes conjunctions such as "and" or "or", then the design has more than one responsibility, and is therefore likely to have side effects.  The responsibilities need to be divided into several modules in order to achieve a functional design.

Critiques and limits

Every computer system has parts that cannot be functionally pure because they exist to distribute CPU cycles or other resources to different modules. For example, most systems have an "initialization" section that starts up the modules. Other well-known examples are the interrupt vector table and the main loop.

Some functions inherently have mixed semantics. For example, a function "move the car from the garage" inherently has a side effect of changing the "car position". In some cases, the mixed semantics can extend over a large topological tree or graph of related concepts. In these unusual cases, functional design is not recommended by some authorities. Instead polymorphism, inheritance, or procedural methods may be preferred.

Applied to 3D modeling and simulation
Recently several software companies have introduced functional design as a concept to describe a Parametric feature based modeler for 3D modeling and simulation.  In this context, they mean a parametric model of an object where the parameters are tied to real-world design criteria, such as an axle that will adjust its diameter based on the strength of the material and the amount of force being applied to it in the simulation.  It is hoped that this will create efficiencies in the design process for mechanical and perhaps even architectural/structural assemblies by integrating the results of finite element analysis directly to the behavior of individual objects.

References

External links
 Functional Design Specification
 7 Essential Guidelines For Functional Design
 Exemplar - CPU 1 FLIGHT SOFTWARE FUNCTIONAL DESIGN DOCUMENT

Software architecture
Computer-aided design
Design